Mini Racer RC-12 is 1/12 scale RC car manufactured by Yokomo from 1977 to the early 1980s. It was produced when Yokobori Mokei changed their name to Yokomo. The RC-12 box had both a Yokomo and Yokobori Mokei label on it. There were two different models in the RC-12 series. "Mini Racer RC-12" came with a narrow chassis and "Mini Racer RC-12 Junior" came with a wide chassis.

Comparison

References

Yokomo